During the 1989–90 English football season, Middlesbrough F.C. competed in the Football League Second Division.

Season summary
In the 1989–90 season, Boro finished 21st in the Second Division, only escaping relegation by two points.

Squad

Appearances and goals

Appearance and goalscoring records for all the players who were in the Middlesbrough F.C. first team squad during the 1989–90 season.

|}

Transfers

In

Out

Final league table

Results

Football League Second Division

FA Cup

League Cup

Full Members' Cup

References

Middlesbrough F.C. seasons
Middlesbrough